John Squire (born 1962) is an English musician.

John Squire may also refer to:

John Squire (British Army officer) (1780–1812) of the Royal Engineers
J. C. Squire (1882–1958), British poet and historian 
Stanley John Squire (1915–1998), politician in British Columbia, Canada
John M. Squire (1945–2021), British biophysicist